The Miss Brazil 2000 pageant took place April 7, 2000. Each state and the Federal District competed for their state and went win the title of the Brazilian Crown. The winner would enter the Miss Universe beauty pageant.

Results

Special awards

Delegates

 - Erika Marcondes Mendes
 - Simonne Luz Menezes
 - Alessandra Resende
 - Viviane Lima de Souza
 - Halina Francisca dos Santos
 - Wanuska Aguiar Dantas
 - Tatiana Pereira Borges
 - Sabrina Trivilim Klein
 - Jelly Silva da Silveira
 - Sabrina Teixeira
 - Josiane Oderdengen Kruliskoski
 - Cláudia Renata Rohde
 - Fernanda Soares dos Santos
 - Waleska Tavares e Silva
 - Jorgelane Caires Miranda
 - Fernanda Letícia Schirr
 - Djanira Pereira
 - Darylane Santos
 - Katty Dembergue Gripp
 - Jussara Brandão
 - Maria Fernanda Schneider Schiavo
 - Ana Paula Nakano
 - Rossiany Bantin
 - Francine Eickemberg
 - Wanessa Martins Fernandes
 - Josiane Santos Ângelo
 - Isabele Araújo Domingos

External links
 Official site (in Portuguese)

2000
2000 in Brazil
2000 beauty pageants